Turn Me Loose (foaled 2011) is a New Zealand Thoroughbred racehorse who is notable for being the winner of a number of Group races and was awarded the title of being the Champion Sprinter & Middle Distance Horse in New Zealand in 2015-16. He has gone on to forge a successful career as a stud stallion. 

He was bred by George Simon, the well known New Zealand race commentator and his wife Maryanne.

Racing career

Turn Me Loose's notable wins and placings included:

 1st in the 2014 Hawke's Bay Guineas (Group 2, 1400m at Hastings), beating Prince Mambo and Longchamp
 1st in the 2014 New Zealand 2000 Guineas (Group 1, 1600m at Riccarton), beating Rockfast (AUS) and Prince Mambo
 1st in the 2015 Seymour Cup, (Listed 1600m at Seymour) beating Scream Machine and Garud
 1st in the 2015 Crystal Mile (Group 2 1600m at Moonee Valley), beating Bow Creek (IRE) and Lucky Hussler 
 1st in the 2015 Emirates Stakes (Group 1, 1600m at Flemington), beating Politeness and Rock Sturdy
 1st in the 2016 Futurity Stakes (MRC) (Group 1, 1400m at Caulfield), beating Stratum Star and Suavito
 2nd in the 2017 C F Orr Stakes behind Black Heart Bart with Ecuador (NZ) 3rd

Stud career

Turn Me Loose stands at Windsor Park Stud, near Cambridge, New Zealand. His 2022 service fee was $20,000 (+ GST).

His first winner was Turn The Ace at Te Rapa on 1 May 2021

Notable progeny

c = colt, f = filly/mare, g = gelding''

See also
  Thoroughbred racing in New Zealand

References

2011 racehorse births
New Zealand Thoroughbred sires